Andre Agassi was the defending champion but did not compete that year.

Alex O'Brien won in the final 7–6(8–6), 6–4 against Jan Siemerink.

Seeds
A champion seed is indicated in bold text while text in italics indicates the round in which that seed was eliminated. The top eight seeds received a bye to the second round.

  Yevgeny Kafelnikov (quarterfinals)
  Richard Krajicek (quarterfinals)
  Jim Courier (third round)
  Wayne Ferreira (semifinals)
  Marcelo Ríos (third round)
  Marc Rosset (quarterfinals)
  Cédric Pioline (second round)
  Arnaud Boetsch (second round)
  Paul Haarhuis (first round)
  Jan Siemerink (final)
  Byron Black (second round)
  Daniel Vacek (quarterfinals)
  Andriy Medvedev (second round)
  Mark Philippoussis (semifinals)
  Andrea Gaudenzi (third round)
  Younes El Aynaoui (first round)

Draw

Finals

Top half

Section 1

Section 2

Bottom half

Section 3

Section 4

External links
 1996 Pilot Pen International draw

1996 Pilot Pen International